Colm Magner is a Canadian actor, writer, and director. He has worked in theatre, television, and film in Canada since 1982, during which time he performed with several of Canada's theatre companies.

Career 
Colm lived in Prince Edward Island, where he taught acting, playwriting, and academic writing at the University of Prince Edward Island. He also worked as the theatre critic for The Guardian from 2016 to 2018.

He has acted in over 30 film and television productions, including Keep the Faith Baby with Harry J. Lennix. He had recurring roles on Street Time (Showtime USA), and This Is Wonderland (CBC Canada).

He has worked as an actor at The Shaw Festival, and has written four solo plays for the stage: Smoke, Dark Avenue, Inside Imogene, and The Scavenger's Daughter which premiered at Confederation Centre in Charlottetown, Prince Edward Island.

The Scavenger's Daughter received critical acclaim when it premiered at the 4th Street Theatre in New York as part of the New York International Fringe Festival in August, 2010, and was remounted at Poor Mouth Theatre in the Bronx in December 2010. Colin Broderick, author of Orangutan and That's That has reviewed The Scavenger's Daughter.

Filmography

Film

Television

References

External links

Interview with Magner

Living people
Year of birth missing (living people)
Canadian male stage actors
Drama teachers